Al-Diwaniya Sport Club is a football club based in Al Diwaniyah, Al-Qādisiyyah, Iraq, the club was formed in 1965 and plays at the Al-Diwaniya Stadium. It currently competes in the Iraqi Premier League.

History

1988–2018 : Ups and downs
The 1988–89 season, the club was playing in Iraqi Premier League for first time, it was less successful during that season, and was relegated to Iraq Division One at the end. But gained promotion three years later, it played in league in three seasons (1992–93, 1993–94, 1994–95), and was relegated to Division One again, but gained promotion four years later.

The club returned to play in premier League for three more seasons (1999–2000, 2000–01, 2001–02), then relegated to Division One for two consecutive years, and then returned to the premier League to play one season (2004–05) and then relegated at the end. Four years later, it returned and played in the premier League for two conconsecutive seasons (2009–10, 2010–11) then relegated and away from the premier League for six years.

In the 2016–17 season, Al-Diwaniya has achieved agreat level under the leadership of coach Qusay Munir, and became champions of the 2016–2017 Iraq Division one and were promoted to the 2017-18 Iraqi Premier League.

Current squad

First-team squad

Current technical staff

{| class="toccolours"
!bgcolor=silver|Position
!bgcolor=silver|Name
!bgcolor=silver|Nationality
|- bgcolor=#eeeeee
|Manager:||Hamza Hadi||
|- 
|Assistant manager:||Ibrahim Abd-Nader||
|-
|Assistant manager:||Haider Karim||
|-bgcolor=#eeeeee
|Goalkeeping coach:||Hamid Kadhim||
|-
|Fitness coach:||Vacant||
|- bgcolor=#eeeeee
|Administrative director:||Ali Aajel||
|-
|U-19 Manager:||Adel Hattab||
|-bgcolor=#eeeeee
|U-16 Manager:||Samah Hussien||
|-
|U-13 Manager:||Jawad Kadhim||
|- bgcolor=#eeeeee
|Director of football:||Hatem Shalal||
|- 
|Administrative Coordinator:||Zakaria Yahia||
|-bgcolor=#eeeeee
|Director of public relations:||Ali Awadh||
|-bgcolor=#eeeeee

Board members

{| class="toccolours"
!bgcolor=silver|Position
!bgcolor=silver|Name
!bgcolor=silver|Nationality
|-bgcolor=#eeeeee
|President:||Hussien Al-Ankoshei||
|-
|Vice-president:||Mazin Farhan||
|--bgcolor=#eeeeee
|Secretary:||Haider Jaber||
|-
|Treasurer:||Abdul Hussein Karim||
|-bgcolor=#eeeeee
|Member of the Board:||Karrar Hamdallah ||
|-
|Member of the Board:||Dhurgham Mahmoud||
|-

Kit suppliers

Managerial history

  Qusay Munir 
  Sabah Abdul Hassan 
  Sami Bahat 
  Nabil Zaki 
  Ahmad Kadhim 
  Haider Yahya 
  Samir Kadhim 
  Ali Hashim 
  Razzaq Farhan 
  Sadiq Saadoun 
  Hamid Rahim 
  Hazim Saleh 
  Saad Hafedh 
  Qusay Munir 
  Samir Kadhim 
  Saeed Mohsen 
  Luciano Soares 
  Ahmed Khalef 
  Ahmed Rahim 
  Haider Karim 
  Hamza Hadi

Honours
Iraq Division One
Winner (2): 2008–09 (shared), 2016–17

References

External links
 Team's profile on kooora.com

Al-Qādisiyyah Governorate
1965 establishments in Iraq
Football clubs in Al-Qādisiyyah